Eolo may refer to:
 Eolo, Bandundu Province, a town on the Kasai River, Democratic Republic of the Congo
 Eolo (car), the first compressed air car
 John Stedham, also known as Eolo, chief of the Muscogee Native American tribe
 , an Italian telecommunications company